Enemies of Laughter is a 2000 American romantic comedy film directed by Joey Travolta and starring David Paymer, Judge Reinhold, Rosalind Chao, Marilu Henner, Bea Arthur and Peter Falk. This was Arthur's final film.

Plot

Cast
David Paymer as Paul
Judge Reinhold as Sam
Rosalind Chao as Carla
Bea Arthur as Paul's Mother
Peter Falk as Paul's Father
Vanessa Angel as Jennifer
Christina Fulton as Regina
Kathy Griffin as Cindy
Marilu Henner as Dani
Paul Sampson as The Waiter
Daphne Zuniga as Judy
Glen Merzer as Josh

Reception
The film has a 57% rating on Rotten Tomatoes.  On Metacritic, the film has a score of 47 out of 100, based on four critics, indicating "mixed or average reviews".

References

External links
 
 

American romantic comedy films
2000s English-language films
2000s American films